The 2022–23 Cruz Azul season is the 63rd season in the football club's history and the 59th consecutive season in the top flight of Mexican football. Cruz Azul will compete in Liga MX.

Season overview

May
On 19 May, Cruz Azul announced the dismissal of Juan Reynoso as the first team coach, ending his spell at the club after 16 months.

On 31 May, Cruz Azul announced the appointment of Diego Aguirre as the new first team head coach until 2023.

August
On 5 August, Cruz Azul announced the signing of Ramiro Funes Mori from Al-Nassr.

On 7 August, Rafael Baca's contract was automatically renewed until the end of 2023 after reaching an undisclosed percentage of minutes played.

February
On 4 February, Carlos Vargas made his debut with Cruz Azul and suffered a season-ending torn ACL in his right knee in the 14th minute of play.

Cruz Azul began the Clausura tournament with a five-game winless streak and four consecutive losses. On 13 February, Cruz Azul announced the dismissal of Raúl Gutiérrez. The under-20 head coach Joaquín Moreno took over training as interim head coach on 14 February with under-18 head coach Joel Huiqui as his assistant. Cruz Azul won their first game of the tournament in week 7, at Puebla, with a score of 3–1.

On 22 February, Cruz Azul announced the hiring of Ricardo Ferretti who signed a contract contingent on his results. Former Cruz Azul managers Guillermo Vázquez and Joaquín Moreno would join Ferretti's coaching staff as assistant coaches.

March

On 2 March, Carlos Rodríguez and Uriel Antuna were called up to the Mexico national football team for their CONCACAF Nations League group stage matches.

On 3 March, Ignacio Rivero played his 100th match with Cruz Azul. The result was a 3–1 loss to Mazatlán, cutting Cruz Azul's three game win streak short and giving Mazatlán their first win of the season.

First-team coaching staff

Players

Squad information
{| class="wikitable" style="text-align:center; font-size:100%;width:80%;"
|-
! style="background:#0046AD; color:#FFFFFF; border:2px solid #E41034;" scope=col| No.
! style="background:#0046AD; color:#FFFFFF; border:2px solid #E41034;" scope=col| Pos.
! style="background:#0046AD; color:#FFFFFF; border:2px solid #E41034;" scope=col| Nat.
! style="background:#0046AD; color:#FFFFFF; border:2px solid #E41034;" scope=col| Name
! style="background:#0046AD; color:#FFFFFF; border:2px solid #E41034;" scope=col| Age
! style="background:#0046AD; color:#FFFFFF; border:2px solid #E41034;" scope=col| Signed in
! style="background:#0046AD; color:#FFFFFF; border:2px solid #E41034;" scope=col| Previous club
|-
| 1
| GK
| 
| align=left| José de Jesús Corona (captain)
| 
| 2009
| align=left|  Tecos UAG
|-
| 3
| DF
| 
| align=left| Jaiber Jiménez
| 
| 2019
| align=left| Youth system
|-
| 4
| DF
| 
| align=left| Julio César Domínguez (vice-captain)
| 
| 2006
| align=left| Youth system
|-
| 6
| MF
| 
| align=left| Erik Lira
| 
| 2022 
| align=left|  Pumas UNAM
|-
| 7
| MF
| 
| align=left| Uriel Antuna
| 
| 2022 
| align=left|  Guadalajara
|-
| 8
| FW
| 
| align=left| Gonzalo Carneiro
| 
| 2022
| align=left|  Liverpool Montevideo
|-
| 11
| FW
| 
| align=left| Christian Tabó
| 
| 2018
| align=left|  Puebla
|-
| 12
| DF
| 
| align=left| José Joaquín Martínez
| 
| 2020
| align=left|  Monarcas Morelia
|-
| 13
| FW
| 
| align=left| Michael Estrada
| 
| 2022
| align=left|  D.C. United
|-
| 14
| MF
| 
| align=left| Alexis Gutiérrez
| 
| 2023 
| align=left|  Tapatío
|-
| 15
| MF
| 
| align=left| Ignacio Rivero (3rd captain)
| 
| 2020
| align=left|  Tijuana
|-
| 17
| MF
| 
| align=left| Alonso Escoboza
| 
| 2022
| align=left|  Necaxa
|-
| 18
| MF
| 
| align=left| Rodrigo Huescas
| 
| 2021
| align=left| Youth system
|-
| 19
| MF
| 
| align=left| Carlos Rodríguez
| 
| 2022 
| align=left|  Monterrey
|-
| 20
| FW
| 
| align=left| Iván Morales
| 
| 2022 
| align=left|  Colo-Colo
|-
| 21
| FW
| 
| align=left| Augusto Lotti
| 
| 2023 
| align=left|  Atlético Tucumán
|-
| 22
| MF
| 
| align=left| Rafael Baca
| 
| 2014 
| align=left|  San Jose Earthquakes
|-
| 23
| MF
| 
| align=left| Ramiro Carrera
| 
| 2023 
| align=left|  Atlético Tucumán
|-
| 24
| DF
| 
| align=left| Juan Escobar
| 
| 2019
| align=left|  Cerro Porteño
|-
| 25
| DF
| 
| align=left| Ramiro Funes Mori
| 
| 2022
| align=left|  Al-Nassr
|-
| 26
| DF
| 
| align=left| Carlos Vargas
| 
| 2023 
| align=left|  Mazatlán
|-
| 28
| DF
| 
| align=left| Jordan Silva
| 
| 2023 
| align=left|  Querétaro
|-
| 29
| FW
| 
| align=left| Carlos Rotondi
| 
| 2022
| align=left|  Defensa y Justicia
|-
| 30
| GK
| 
| align=left| Andrés Gudiño
| 
| 2019
| align=left|  Tepatitlán
|-
| 33
| GK
| 
| align=left| Sebastián Jurado
| 
| 2020 
| align=left|  Veracruz

Transfers

Transfers in

Summer

Winter

Transfers out

Pre-season and friendlies

Matches

Copa SKY

The second edition of the Copa por México will be held with ten Liga MX teams and will serve as a pre-season for the Clausura 2022 tournament.

Group stage

Competitions

Overview

Liga MX

Torneo Apertura

League table

Results summary

Results round by round

Matches

Reclassification

Quarter-finals

Torneo Clausura

League table

Results summary

Results round by round

Matches

Squad statistics

Appearances

Players with no appearances are not included on the list.

Goalscorers
Includes all competitive matches.

Clean sheets
The list is sorted by shirt number when total clean sheets are equal. Numbers in parentheses represent games where both goalkeepers participated and both kept a clean sheet; the number in parentheses is awarded to the goalkeeper who was substituted on, whilst a full clean sheet is awarded to the goalkeeper who was on the field at the start of play.

Disciplinary record

{| class="wikitable" style="text-align:center;width:80%;"
|-
! rowspan=2 style="background:#0046AD; color:#FFFFFF; " width=15| 
! rowspan=2 style="background:#0046AD; color:#FFFFFF; " width=15| 
! rowspan=2 style="background:#0046AD; color:#FFFFFF; " width=15| 
! rowspan=2 style="background:#0046AD; color:#FFFFFF; " width=140| Name
! colspan=3 style="background:#0046AD; color:#FFFFFF; " width=120| Apertura 2022
! colspan=3 style="background:#0046AD; color:#FFFFFF; " width=120| Apertura Liguilla
! colspan=3 style="background:#0046AD; color:#FFFFFF; " width=120| Clausura 2023
! colspan=3 style="background:#0046AD; color:#FFFFFF; " width=150| Supercopa de la Liga
! colspan=3 style="background:#0046AD; color:#FFFFFF; " width=120| Total
|-
! style="background:#0046AD; color:#FFFFFF; " width=35| 
! style="background:#0046AD; color:#FFFFFF; " width=35| 
! style="background:#0046AD; color:#FFFFFF; " width=35| 
! style="background:#0046AD; color:#FFFFFF; " width=35| 
! style="background:#0046AD; color:#FFFFFF; " width=35| 
! style="background:#0046AD; color:#FFFFFF; " width=35| 
! style="background:#0046AD; color:#FFFFFF; " width=35| 
! style="background:#0046AD; color:#FFFFFF; " width=35| 
! style="background:#0046AD; color:#FFFFFF; " width=35| 
! style="background:#0046AD; color:#FFFFFF; " width=35| 
! style="background:#0046AD; color:#FFFFFF; " width=35| 
! style="background:#0046AD; color:#FFFFFF; " width=35| 
! style="background:#0046AD; color:#FFFFFF; " width=35| 
! style="background:#0046AD; color:#FFFFFF; " width=35| 
! style="background:#0046AD; color:#FFFFFF; " width=35| 
|-
| 1
| GK
| 
|align=left| José de Jesús Corona
||1|| || || || || ||4||1|| || || || ||5||1||
|-
| 2
| DF
| 
|align=left| Alejandro Mayorga
||1|| || || || || || || || || || || ||1|| ||
|-
| 3
| DF
| 
|align=left| Jaiber Jiménez
||1|| || || || || || || || || || || ||1|| ||
|-
| 4
| DF
| 
|align=left| 
||2|| || ||1|| || ||2|| || || || || ||5|| ||
|-
| 5
| DF
| 
|align=left| Luis Abram
||1|| || || || || || || || ||1|| || ||2|| ||
|-
| 6
| MF
| 
|align=left| Erik Lira
||1|| || ||1|| || ||3|| || || || || ||5|| ||
|-
| 7
| FW
| 
|align=left| Uriel Antuna
||3|| || ||1|| || ||1|| || || || || ||5|| ||
|-
| 8
| FW
| 
|align=left| Gonzalo Carneiro
||3|| || || || || ||1|| || || || || ||4|| ||
|-
| 9
| FW
| 
|align=left| Santiago Giménez
|| || || || || || || || || ||1|| || ||1|| ||
|-
| 10
| FW
| 
|align=left| Ángel Romero
||2|| || || || || || || || || || || ||2|| ||
|-
| 11
| FW
| 
|align=left| Christian Tabó
||4|| || || || || || || || || || || ||4|| ||
|-
| 12
| DF
| 
|align=left| José Joaquín Martínez
||3|| || || || || || || || || || || ||3|| ||
|-
| 13
| FW
| 
|align=left| Michael Estrada
||1|| || || || || ||1||1|| || || || ||2||1||
|-
| 15
| MF
| 
|align=left| Ignacio Rivero
||3|| || || || || ||3|| || || || || ||6|| ||
|-
| 17
| MF
| 
|align=left| Alonso Escoboza
|| || || || || || ||1|| || || || || ||1|| ||
|-
| 18
| MF
| 
|align=left| Rodrigo Huescas
||1|| || || || || || || || || || || ||1|| ||
|-
| 19
| MF
| 
|align=left| Carlos Rodríguez
||4|| || ||1|| || ||1|| || || || || ||6|| ||
|-
| 20
| FW
| 
|align=left| Iván Morales
|| || ||1|| || || ||1|| || || || || ||1|| ||1
|-
| 21
| FW
| 
|align=left| Augusto Lotti
|| || || || || || ||1|| || || || || ||1|| ||
|-
| 22
| MF
| 
|align=left| Rafael Baca
||3|| ||1|| || || || || || || || || ||3|| ||1
|-
| 24
| DF
| 
|align=left| Juan Escobar
||2|| || || || || ||4|| || ||1|| || ||7|| ||
|-
| 25
| DF
| 
|align=left| Ramiro Funes Mori
|| || || || || || ||1|| || || || || ||1|| ||
|-
| 29
| FW
| 
|align=left| Carlos Rotondi
||2|| ||1|| || || ||1|| || || || || ||3|| ||1
|-
| 33
| GK
| 
|align=left| Sebastián Jurado
||1|| ||1|| || || || || || || || || ||1|| ||1
|-
| 200
| DF
| 
|align=left| Jorge García
||1|| || || || || || || || || || || ||1|| ||
|-
! style="background:#0046AD; color:#FFFFFF; "; colspan=2 rowspan=2|Coach
| 
|align=left| Diego Aguirre
||  || || 1 || || || || || || || || || || || ||1
|-
| 
|align=left| Juan Rubio (Kinesiologist)
||  || || || || || || || ||1|| || || || || ||1
|-
! style="background:#0046AD; color:#FFFFFF; "; colspan=4|  Totals
!40||0||5||4||0||0||25||2||1||3||0||0||72||2||6

Notes

References

External links

Cruz
Cruz Azul seasons